This is a list of books which have been featured on BBC Radio 4's Book of the Week during 2017.

January
 Labyrinths by Catrine Clay, read by Deborah Findlay and Henry Goodman
 The Reformation by Diarmaid MacCulloch
 The Novel of the Century by David Bellos, read by Daniel Weyman
 Man of Iron by Julian Glover, read by Robin Laing

February
 Once Upon a Time in the East by Xiaolu Guo, read by Chipo Chung
 Age of Anger by Pankaj Mishra, read by the author
 Deaths of the Poets by Michael Symmons Roberts and Paul Farley, read by the authors
 Border – Tales from the Edge of Europe by Kapka Kassabova, read by Indira Varma

March
 What Happened, Miss Simone? by Alan Light, read by Alibe Parsons
 The Rule of the Land by Garrett Carr, read by John Paul Connolly
 The Word Detective by John Simpson, read by Nigel Anthony
 Fathers and Sons by Howard Cunnell, read by James Lailey
 Be Like the Fox by Erica Benner, read by Toby Jones

April
 And Our Faces, My Heart, Brief as Photos by John Berger, read by Simon McBurney
 David Jones: Engraver, Soldier, Painter, Poet by Thomas Dilworth, read by Nicholas Farrell

May
 Balancing Acts by Nicholas Hytner, read by the author
 Between Them by Richard Ford
 Admissions: A Life in Brain Surgery by Henry Marsh, read by Robert Powell
 Sound by Bella Bathurst, read by Adjoa Andoh
 Farewell to the Horse by Ulrich Raulff, read by Iain Glen

June
 The Surreal Life of Leonora Carrington by Joanna Moorhead, read by Juliet Stevenson
 The Secret Life by Andrew O'Hagan, read by the author
 The Secret Lives of Colour by Kassia St Clair, read by Francesca Dymond
 Believe Me by Eddie Izzard, read by the author

July
 Big Pig, Little Pig by Jacqueline Yallop, read by Imogen Stubbs
 RISINGTIDEFALLINGSTAR by Philip Hoare, read by Tobias Menzies
 Fall Down Seven Times, Get Up Eight by Naoki Higashida, translated by David Mitchell, read by Matthew Beard
 Shark Drunk by Morten Stroksnes, translated by Tiina Nunnally, read by Adrian Scarborough

August
 The Unwomanly Face of War by Svetlana Alexievich, read by Sarah Badel, Teresa Gallagher and Jane Whittenshaw
 Gainsborough: A Portrait by James Hamilton, read by Julian Rhind-Tutt
 The Hungry Empire by Lizzie Collingham, read by Melody Grove
 I Am, I Am, I Am by Maggie O'Farrell, read by Hattie Morahan
 How Not to Be a Boy by Robert Webb, read by the author

September
 Every Third Thought by Robert McCrum, read by Nicky Henson
 South and West by Joan Didion, read by Laurel Lefkow
 Following Pappano
 Wounds by Fergal Keane

October
 The Rub of Time by Martin Amis, read by Bill Nighy
 The Letters of Sylvia Plath, read by Lydia Wilson
 How to Be Champion by Sarah Millican, read by the author
 Daemon Voices by Philip Pullman
 Anthony Powell: Dancing to the Music of Time by Hilary Spurling, read by Hattie Morahan

November
 Life in the Garden by Penelope Lively, read by Stephanie Cole
 The Dawn Watch by Katrin Williams, read by Laurel Lefkow
 The Vanity Fair Diaries by Tina Brown, read by the author
 Lou Reed: A Life by Demetri Goritsas, read by the author

December
 Over and Out by Henry Blofeld, read by the author
 A collection of letters on the theme of Letters from South Africa
 Strangers by Bongani Kona, read by the author
 Mark Gevisser
 Shosholoza: The Train that Keeps Moving by Panashe Chigumadzi, read by the author
 This Is What a Country Looks Like When it Is Collapsing by Lidudumalingani Mqombothi
 Johannesburg by Fiona Melrose, read by the author
 Village Christmas by Laurie Lee, read by Derek Jacobi
 Adventures of a Young Naturalist by David Attenborough

References

Lists of books
Lists of radio series episodes